Mardiros Altounian (1889–1958) was an Armenian-Lebanese architect. He designed the Lebanese Parliament Building in Beirut (1931), the Abed clock tower (1934), Azounieh sanitorum in Chouf, and Melkonian Benefactors' Mausoleum in Cyprus (with French-Armenian sculptor Leon Mouradoff). Altounian was French-Armenian. The mausoleum replaced an older wooden trellis monument and was completed in 1956.

Altounian graduated from the Ecole des Beaux Arts in Paris, France, in 1918.

References

Video
Video of a tribute to Altounian and unveiling of a sculpture of him

See also
Youssef Aftimus
list of Lebanese architects

Lebanese people of Armenian descent
Lebanese architects